Valmiki Nagar Assembly constituency is an assembly constituency in Paschim Champaran district in the Indian state of Bihar. Dhirendra Pratap Singh alias Rinku Singh of JDU is the MLA.

Overview
As per orders of Delimitation of Parliamentary and Assembly constituencies Order, 2008, No. 1 Valmiki Nagar Assembly constituency is composed of the following:
Piprasi, Madhubani, Thakrahan and Bhitaha community development blocks; and Valmiki Nagar, Laxmipur Rampurwa, Santpur Soharia, ChampapurGonauli, Naurangia Dardari, Mahuawa Katharawa, Harnatand, Balua Chhatraul, Dewaria Taruanwa, Bharachhi, Belahawa Madanpur, Bakuli Panchgwa, Binwalia Bodhser, Nayagaon Rampur, Mangalpur Ausani, Borawal Narawal, Semra Katkuiya, Yamunapur Tadwalia, Jimari Nautanawa and Dholbajwa Laxmipur gram panchayats of Sidhaw CD Block.

Valmiki Nagar Assembly constituency is part of No. 1 Valmiki Nagar (Lok Sabha constituency).

Members of Legislative Assembly

Election results

2020

2015

2010

References

External links
 

Assembly constituencies of Bihar
Politics of West Champaran district